The men's light flyweight event was part of the boxing programme at the 1976 Summer Olympics. The weight class was the lightest contested, and allowed boxers of up to 48 kilograms to compete. The competition was held from 19 to 31 July 1976. 27 boxers from 27 nations competed.

Medalists

Results
The following boxers took part in the event:

First round
 Armando Guevara (VEN) def. Eduardo Baltar (PHI), 5:0
 Li Byong-Uk (PRK) def. Sidney McKnight (CAN), KO-1
 Henryk Średnicki (POL) def. Louis Curtis (USA), 5:0
 Aleksandr Tkachenko (URS) def. Eleoncio Mercedes (DOM), RSC-1
 Payao Poontarat (THA) def. Remus Cosma (ROM), 4:1
 Serdamba Batsuk (MGL) def. Enrique Rodríguez (ESP), RSC-3
 György Gedó (HUN) def. Said Bashiri (IRN), KO-2
 Orlando Maldonado(PUR) def. Lucky Mutale (ZAM), walk-over
 Brendan Dunne (IRL) def. Noboru Uchizama (JPN), RSC-2
 Said Mohamed Abdelwahab (EGY) def. José Leroy (FRA), KO-1
 Héctor Patri (ARG) def. Alodji Edoh (TOG), walk-over
 Chan-Hee Park (KOR) def. Abderahim Najim (MAR), DSQ-3
 Alican Az (TUR) def. Stephen Muchoki (KEN), walk-over
 Jorge Hernández (CUB) def. Beyhan Fuchedzhiev (BUL), RSC-3
 Zoffa Yarawi (PNG) def. Venostos Ochira (UGA), walk-over

Second round
 Armando Guevara (VEN) def. Dietmar Geilich (GDR), 5:0
 Li Byong-Uk (PRK) def. Henryk Średnicki (POL), 3:2
 Payao Poontarat (THA) def. Aleksandr Tkachenko (URS), 3:2
 György Gedó (HUN) def. Serdamba Batsuk (MGL), 5:0
 Orlando Maldonado (PUR) def. Brendan Dunne (IRL), KO-1
 Héctor Patri (ARG) def. Said Mohamed Abdelwahab (EGY), walk-over
 Chan-Hee Park (KOR) def. Alican Az (TUR), 5:0
 Jorge Hernández (CUB) def. Zoffa Zarawi (PNG), KO-3

Quarterfinals
 Li Byong-Uk (PRK) def. Armando Guevara (VEN), 3:2
 Payao Poontarat (THA) def. György Gedó (HUN), 4:1
 Orlando Maldonado (PUR) def. Héctor Patri (ARG), 5:0
 Jorge Hernández (CUB) def. Chan-Hee Park (KOR), 3:2

Semifinals
 Li Byong-Uk (PRK) def. Payao Poontarat (THA), RSC-2
 Jorge Hernández (CUB) def. Orlando Maldonado (PUR), 5:0

Final
 Jorge Hernández (CUB) def. Li Byong-Uk (PRK), 4:1

References

Light Flyweight